Srinivasan Varadarajan (31 March 1928 – 11 May 2022) was an Indian chemist, civil servant, corporate executive and the former chairman of several public sector undertakings such as Indian Petrochemicals Corporation Limited (IPCL), Petrofils Cooperative Limited, Engineers India Limited (EIL), and Bridge and Roof Company (India). Born on 31 March 1928 in Tamil Nadu, he obtained two master's degrees (MA and MSc) from Madras University and Andhra University and two doctoral degrees (PhD) from University of Delhi and University of Cambridge and worked as a faculty member at several educational institutions such as Delhi University (1949–53), Massachusetts Institute of Technology (1956-57) and Department of Radiotherapeutics, University of Cambridge (1957–59). He was an elected fellow of the Indian National Science Academy (1983), Indian Academy of Sciences (1972) and The World Academy of Sciences (1997). The Government of India awarded him the third highest civilian honour of the Padma Bhushan, in 1985, for his contributions to society.

See also 
 List of University of Delhi people
 List of Madras University alumni
 List of University of Cambridge people

References 

Recipients of the Padma Bhushan in civil service
1928 births
2022 deaths
Scientists from Tamil Nadu
20th-century Indian chemists
Indian business executives
Indian civil servants
University of Madras alumni
Andhra University alumni
Delhi University alumni
Academic staff of Delhi University
Alumni of the University of Cambridge
Massachusetts Institute of Technology faculty
Fellows of the Indian Academy of Sciences
Fellows of the Indian National Science Academy
TWAS fellows